The Flower Woman of Potsdam Square is a 1925 German silent comedy film directed by Jaap Speyer and starring Erika Glässner, Ralph Arthur Roberts, and Reinhold Schünzel.

The film's sets were designed by the art director Franz Schroedter.

Cast

References

Bibliography

External links

1925 films
1925 comedy films
German comedy films
Films of the Weimar Republic
German silent feature films
German black-and-white films
Films directed by Jaap Speyer
Films set in Berlin
Silent comedy films
1920s German films
1920s German-language films